Tomo Station is a HRT station on Astram Line, located in 8669-4, Tomo, Numata-cho, Asaminami-ku, Hiroshima.

Platforms

Connections
█ Astram Line
●Chōrakuji — ●Tomo — ●Ōbara

Around station
Hiroshima City Asaminami Ward Sports Center
Koryo High School

History
Opened on August 20, 1994.

See also
Astram Line
Hiroshima Rapid Transit

References 

Tomo Station